"Primaveral" is a song by Chilean singer Mon Laferte released on October 16, 2017, through Universal Music Group as part of her forth studio album La Trenza. The song was written by Laferte, produced by herself and Manuel Soto.

Background

This song, according to a publication of La Tercera that reviews the album La Trenza: " [it's] a different theme within the vintage tonic of La Trenza, pop rock with some acoustic tones in half time. 'I'm unstable but you know I love you', ends in the choir that connects with the formula of international pop in the late 60s".

Music video 

The music video was directed by Gamaliel de Santiago, it was recorded for two days in Mexican locations such as Condesa, Insurgente and La Marquesa. The clip shows Mon Laferte next to a wooden or cardboard figure as her boyfriend, which is different from she and very fragile, to the point that she can raise it like a comet or break it without wanting an arm, symbolizing in this way the fragile of human relationships, says the artist about it: "The idea of the video was how fragile they are relationships, and in the end we all make mistakes, we hurt, sometimes not wanting to".

The video and the song are a favorite of the Chilean artist, stating: "It's my favorite video of a lifetime. I think it's the most beautiful video we've made. It's beautiful. And the song I think is also my favorite of La Trenza".

Personnel 
Credits adapted from La Trenza liner notes.

Vocals

 Mon Laferte – lead vocals
 Juanes – lead vocals
 Esván Lemus – background vocals
 Jerry Velásquez – background vocals
 René Mooi – background vocals

Musicians

 Fermín Fortiz – bass guitar
 Ram – clarinet
 Enrique Lara – guitar
 Juanes – guitar
 Manuel Soto – guitar, organ
 Juan Molina – percussion
 Felipe Sanabria – saxophone
 Erick Rodríguez – trombone
 Humberto Sanabria – trumpet

Production

Manuel Soto – production
Eduardo del Águila – mixing, recording
Alan Ortiz – recording
Chalo González – recording
Dave Poler – recording

Charts

Weekly charts

Year-end charts

References

2017 songs
2017 singles
Mon Laferte songs
Songs written by Mon Laferte